Nika is a female or male given name having multiple origins in different languages and countries. In Slavic countries the name comes from the Ancient Greek goddess of victory "Nike" (some personalities coming from Slavic countries are listed below). Nika is a female name in Persian, language meaning "very good" and "pure crystal water" , it derives from "Nik" meaning "Good", "True" and "Chosen". Nika is also the name of a river in north of Iran. Zoroastrianism, the ancient Iranian religion believes in the motto "Pendar Nik" (Good Thoughts), "Goftar Nik" (Good Words), and "Kerdar Nik" (Good Deeds). In the Pashto language, Nika is a male given name meaning "grandfather". In Saraiki language Nika means "little" and used to be a popular nickname for the youngest boy in the family .

In Slovenia and Croatia, Nika is used as a feminine form of Nikola or Nikolaj. In the Russian language, Nika may be a diminutive of the male given name Agafonik or of the female given name Agafonika. As well as a form of female name Veronika. In Igbo culture, Nika, shortened version of female Ginika or Ginikanwa.

People

Arts and entertainment
Nika Futterman, aka Nika Frost, American voice actress
Nika McGuigan (1986 — 2019), Irish actress
Nika Turbina (1974 — 2002), Russian poet

Politics
Nika Gilauri (born 1975), Georgian politician, Prime Minister of Georgia from 2009 to 2012
Nika Gvaramia (born 1976), Georgian lawyer and politician nicknamed "Nika"
Nika Rurua (born 1968), Georgian politician

Sports
Nika Barič (born 1992), Slovenian basketball player
Nika Chkhapeliya (born 1994), Russian association football player
Nika Dzalamidze (born 1992), Georgian association football player
Nika Fleiss (born 1984), Croatian former alpine skier
Nika Gorovska, Ukrainian scout, member of the World Scout Committee
Nika Kiladze (born 1988), Georgian association football player
Nika Križnar (born 2000), Slovenian ski jumper
Nika Metreveli (born 1991), Georgian basketball player
Nika Ožegović (born 1985), Croatian former tennis player
Nika Piliyev (born 1991), Russian association football player

Other
Nika Shakarami, Iranian teenager killed in 2022 after protests in Teheran

Fictional characters
Nika Volek, a character from the Fox television series Prison Break
Sun God Nika, a character from the manga series One Piece

See also

Nia (given name)
Nike (name)
Nina (name)
Niña (name)

References

Notes

Sources
Н. А. Петровский (N. A. Petrovsky). "Словарь русских личных имён" (Dictionary of Russian First Names). ООО Издательство "АСТ". Москва, 2005. 

Iranian masculine given names
Persian feminine given names
Greek feminine given names
Georgian masculine given names
Croatian feminine given names
Slovene feminine given names
Russian feminine given names